was a Japanese diplomat.

Biography
He was born on August 25, 1876.

He came to the United States in 1902 as a member of the Japanese Embassy at Washington, D.C., was consul general at San Francisco in 1916–18, then returned to Japan as director of the Bureau of Commerce of the Japanese Foreign Office.  He was a member of the Ishii Mission from which came the Lansing–Ishii Agreement.  He was also an influential member of the Washington Disarmament Conference.  In December 1922, he was appointed ambassador to the United States, and arrived in Washington in February 1923.  His protest, in April 1924, on the passage of the immigration law by the United States government because it would bar the admission of Japanese to the country, was interpreted as "a veiled threat" by the Senate, and had quite an opposite effect from that intended. After the passage of the bill, It was rumored that Hanihara was to be recalled by the Japanese government. Although this was denied, it was soon announced that he would visit Tokyo on leave of absence.

He came back to Japan in 1924 and resigned his Government post in 1927. He died at the age of 58 in 1934.

References

|-

1876 births
1934 deaths
Ambassadors of Japan to the United States